Nicholas Riley Keaton (born August 9, 1997) is an American politician who has served as a Delegate from the 11th District to the West Virginia House of Delegates since 2020. Keaton is a Republican.

Early life, education, and career
Keaton was born in Spencer, West Virginia, to Tony and Tracey Keaton. He studied for his Bachelor of Economics degree at West Virginia University. As a teenager, Keaton was politically active. Before assuming office, Keaton was employed as the president of a limited liability company.

Elections

2016
In his first primary, Keaton narrowly lost to incumbent Rick Atkinson in a three-way race, receiving 37.36% of the vote and missing the nomination by only 28 votes.

2020
In the 2020 primary, Keaton defeated Atkinson with 52.01% of the vote to win the nomination.

In the general election, Keaton defeated Democrat Mark Pauley with 66.46% of the vote.

2022 
In 2022, Keaton's district changed following the states redistricting. He was once again up against Rick Atkinson in the primary. On May 10, 2022, he went on to win the primary with 56% of the vote to Atkinson's 44%.

In the general election, Keaton defeated Democrat Chuck Conner with 30.1% of the vote.

Tenure

Committee assignments
Banking and Insurance
Judiciary
Small Business and Economic Development
Technology & Infrastructure

Keaton is an assistant majority whip in the House of Delegates.

Keaton has a 92% rating from the NRA and a 100% rating from the West Virginia Citizens Defense League, a regional gun rights organization.

DC statehood
With many of his fellow Delegates, Keaton signed onto a resolution requesting West Virginia Senators and Congresspeople to oppose bills that would allow statehood for the District of Columbia.

Education
Keaton opposed Senate Bill 680, a bill that would make it harder for school staff to be given raises, but the bill passed the House of Delegates despite some Republican opposition.

Freedom of speech
Keaton was the lead sponsor of House Bill 2595, a bill that would prohibit so-called "divisive concepts" from being taught in West Virginia schools or promoted in other state-funded agencies. It targeted criticisms of American society, eliminating language that would refer to the US as a "fundamentally racist or sexist" country.

Worker's rights
Keaton voted for SB 11, a bill that would make it more difficult for employees to strike.

Personal life
Keaton is a Catholic. On October 8, 2022, Keaton married Sadie Shields at the Basilica of the Co-Cathedral of the Sacred Heart in Charleston.

References

1997 births
Living people
21st-century American politicians
Republican Party members of the West Virginia House of Delegates
Catholics from West Virginia
People from Spencer, West Virginia